Thomas McKean Pettit (December 26, 1797 – May 30, 1853) was a United States lawyer, politician, and judge who was briefly Director of the United States Mint in 1853 before his death in office.

Biography

Thomas M. Pettit was born in Philadelphia on December 26, 1797, the son of merchant Andrew Pettit (son of Charles Pettit) and his wife Elizabeth (McKean) Pettit (daughter of Thomas McKean). Pettit entered the College of the University of Pennsylvania in 1812.  On October 2, 1813, he was one of thirteen founding members of the Philomathean Society.  He received an A.B. in 1815 and an A.M.  in 1818.

After graduating from college, Pettit became a lawyer.  By 1820, he was City Solicitor of Philadelphia.  From 1824 to 1828, he was Deputy Attorney General to the Supreme and Oyer and Terminer Courts of Philadelphia.  He was elected as a member of the Pennsylvania General Assembly in 1830; in 1831, he also served as a member of the Philadelphia City Council.

In 1832, Pettit became an Associate Judge of the District Court of Philadelphia.  From 1835 to 1845, he was the district's presiding judge.  He resigned from the bench in 1845 when he was appointed United States Attorney for the Eastern District of Pennsylvania.  President of the United States Martin Van Buren later appointed him to the Board of Visitors of the United States Military Academy.  In 1853, President Franklin Pierce appointed Pettit Director of the United States Mint.  Pettit, however, died after only a few weeks in office.

References

External links 
 

1797 births
1853 deaths
Directors of the United States Mint
Members of the Pennsylvania House of Representatives
Pennsylvania state court judges
Philadelphia City Council members
United States Attorneys for the Eastern District of Pennsylvania
University of Pennsylvania alumni
Pierce administration personnel
19th-century American judges